Behind the Green Lights is a 1935 American crime film directed by Christy Cabanne and starring Norman Foster, Judith Allen and Sidney Blackmer.

Partial cast
 Norman Foster as Detective Lt. Dave Britten  
 Judith Allen as Mary Kennedy  
 Sidney Blackmer as Raymond Cortell  
 Purnell Pratt as Detective Lt. Jim Kennedy  
 Theodore von Eltz as John C. Owen  
 Ford Sterling as Max Schultz, German Janitor  
 Kenneth Thomson as Charles T. 'Ritzy' Conrad  
 Lloyd Whitlock as Assistant District Attorney  
 Edward Hearn as Detective Brewster  
 Jane Meredith as Mrs. Gorham  
 Edward Gargan as Moran - a Cop  
 J. Carrol Naish as Sam Dover  
 John Davidson as Beasley  
 Hooper Atchley as District Attorney Marsden  
 Marc Loebell as Manny Spivalo  
 Fern Emmett as Sarah - the Cook  
 John Ince as Judge #1  
 Ralph Lewis as Judge #2 / Lawyer

References

Bibliography
 Goble, Alan. The Complete Index to Literary Sources in Film. Walter de Gruyter, 1999.

External links
 
 

1935 films
1935 crime films
American crime films
Films directed by Christy Cabanne
American black-and-white films
Films produced by Nat Levine
1930s English-language films
1930s American films